The Yingying Pagoda of Yongji County, Shanxi province, China, is a pagoda whose present structure dates from the Ming dynasty.

History
The pagoda was first established in the Tang dynasty at the same time as the Pujiu temple, which no longer exists. The present-day pagoda dates from 1563 during the Ming dynasty. According to local legend, the designer of the pagoda hid two golden frogs somewhere inside the pagoda. It is popular for visitors to use rocks to knock against the walls in search of hollows where the frogs may be hidden.

Structure
The pagoda is 50 meters tall, and square shaped. It has 13 floors.

Notes

References
Xu Xiaoying, ed. Zhongguo Guta Zaoxing. Beijing: Chinese Forest Press, 2007.

Pagodas in China
Ming dynasty architecture
Buildings and structures in Shanxi